Engelgardt, or Engelhardt, is a lunar impact crater on the far side of the Moon, located to the north of the huge walled plain Korolev. The satellite crater Engelgardt B is attached to the north rim of this crater, and is actually a much larger formation with a diameter of 163 km. To the west-northwest is the crater Lebedinskiy.

This is a circular crater with a rim that has been only mildly eroded. The material on the inner sides has slid down to form piles of scree along the base. The inner wall is narrowed to the south, where the satellite crater Engelgardt N lies adjacent to the edge. Less than a crater diameter to the east-southeast is a small crater with a high albedo surrounded by a skirt of light surface. This skirt reaches to the edge of Engelgardt's rim.

The highest-elevation point on the entire surface of the Moon (10,786 m/35,387 ft above the mean lunar elevation) is located on the east rim of Engelgardt Crater.

Engelgardt lies on the southern margin of the Dirichlet-Jackson Basin.

Satellite craters
By convention these features are identified on lunar maps by placing the letter on the side of the crater midpoint that is closest to Engelgardt.

References

 
 
 
 
 
 
 
 
 
 
 
 

Impact craters on the Moon